Huang Nubo (born 1956) is a Chinese real estate developer, entrepreneur, poet, and mountaineer who founded and remains Chairman of Beijing Zhongkun Investment Group.  According to Hurun Report, his net worth is US$2.3 billion as of 2014, ranking 90th among the 400 richest Chinese.

Born in Lanzhou, Gansu province, Huang grew up in Yinchuan, Ningxia. From 1977 to 1981, he studied at Peking University's Chinese Language department, receiving a bachelor's degree. From 1981 to 1990, Huang took up work in the Publicity Department of the Communist Party of China. From 1996 to 1998, he studied for his Executive Master of Business Administration, which he received from the China Europe International Business School (CEIBS).

Huang began writing poetry in 1976, and has released several collections, including "Do not love me again", "Refusing melancholy" in 1995, and his most recent "Rabbits and other small creatures". He also released in 2005 the short story "The blue sun".

As a mountaineer, Huang has ascended several of the world's highest peaks, including Mount Kilimanjaro in 2005 and Mount Everest in 2008. Huang is also a polar expedition enthusiast.

In August 2011, Huang caused a stir in Iceland when he proposed to buy  of the island, encompassing 0.3% of the country, to develop a $200 million property with a "120-room hotel, airport, golf course and horse-riding facilities." The proposal was met with skepticism in Iceland.

Currently, he is the chairman of Beijing Zhongkun Investment Group, director of the Chinese Poetry Association, and vice-president of the Chinese Mountaineers Society.

Huang has given over 1 billion renminbi to charity.

References

Living people
1956 births
Businesspeople from Gansu
People from Lanzhou
Peking University alumni
Chinese mountain climbers
Chinese summiters of Mount Everest
People's Republic of China poets
Chinese billionaires
Poets from Gansu
Sent-down youths
China Europe International Business School alumni